Blomberg may refer to:

People
 Blomberg (surname), a surname (including a list of people with the name).
 Freiherr von Blomberg family

Places
 Blomberg, North Rhine-Westphalia, a town in the district of Lippe, North Rhine-Westphalia, Germany
 Blomberg, Lower Saxony, a municipality in the district of Wittmund, Lower Saxony, Germany

Other uses
 Blomberg B, a "B" diesel locomotive truck
 Blomberg's toad, a species of toad
 Blomberg, a household appliance brand owned by Arçelik

See also
 Blomberg–Fritsch affair
 Bloomberg (disambiguation)